Warri is a locality in the Queanbeyan-Palerang Region, Southern Tablelands, New South Wales, Australia. It lies mostly southwest of the Kings Highway between Bungendore and Braidwood and on the north bank of the Shoalhaven River.

References

Queanbeyan–Palerang Regional Council
Localities in New South Wales
Southern Tablelands